Tobi 12 - Coptic Calendar - Tobi 14

The thirteenth day of the Coptic month of Tobi, the fifth month of the Coptic year. On a common year, this day corresponds to January 8, of the Julian Calendar, and January 21, of the Gregorian Calendar. This day falls in the Coptic Season of Shemu, the season of the Harvest. On this day, the Coptic Church celebrates the Feast of the Wedding at Cana of Galilee, one of the minor Feasts of the Lord.

Commemorations

Feast 

 The Feast of the Wedding at Cana of Galilee

Saints 

 The martyrdom of Saint Demiana
 The departure of Saint Theophilus the Monk

References 

Days of the Coptic calendar